Mark Prendergast (born 1978) is an Irish hurler who played as a right wing-back for the Cork senior team.

Born in Cork, Prendergast first played competitive hurling whilst at school at St. Finbarr's College. He arrived on the inter-county scene at the age of seventeen when he first linked up with the Cork minor team, before later joining the under-21 side. He joined the senior panel during the 2001 championship. Prendergast went on to play a bit part for Cork, and won one Munster medal. He was an All-Ireland runner-up as a non-playing substitute on one occasion.

At club level Prendergast is a one-time championship medallist with Na Piarsaigh.

Throughout his career Prendergast made just two championship appearances for Cork. He retired form inter-county hurling following the conclusion of the 2004 National Hurling League.

Playing career

Club

Prendergast enjoyed much success as a dual player at underage levels with Na Piarsaigh.

In 2004 Prendergast was captain of the Na Piarsaigh senior hurling team that faced Cloyne in the championship decider. A remarkable second-half display blew away the challenge of a Cloyne side in search of their first ever senior title. The 0-17 to 0-10 victory gave Prendergast a Cork Senior Hurling Championship medal.

Inter-county

Prendergast first played for Cork as a member of the minor hurling team in 1996. Cork's campaign ended with a 0-16 to 1-9 Munster semi-final defeat by Tipperary.

Two years later Prendergast had joined the Cork under-21 team. He won his sole Munster medal that year following a 3-18 to 1-10 victory over Tipperary. For the second year in-a-row Cork later faced Galway in the All-Ireland decider. In a close game Cork just about secured a 2-15 to 2-10 victory, with Prendergast winning an All-Ireland medal.

Prendergast was an unused substitute for Cork during their short-lived championship campaign. After being dropped from the panel the following year, he was recalled to the panel in 2003. On 29 June 2003 Prendergast made his senior championship debut when he came on as a substitute in Cork's 3-16 to 3-12 Munster final defeat of Waterford. After missing Cork's drawn All-Ireland semi-final with Wexford through injury, Prendergast again played a cameo role in their subsequent victory in the replay. He remained on the substitutes' bench in Cork's subsequent 1-14 to 1-11 All-Ireland final defeat by Kilkenny.

In 2004 Prendergast played in some of Cork's National Hurling League games, however, he was not included on Cork's championship panel.

Honours

Team

Na Piarsaigh
Cork Senior Hurling Championship (1): 2004 (c)

Cork
Munster Senior Hurling Championship (1): 2003
All-Ireland Under-21 Hurling Championship (1): 1998
Munster Under-21 Hurling Championship (1): 1998

References

1978 births
Living people
Na Piarsaigh hurlers
Cork inter-county hurlers